Tom Hale (born 1968) is an American technology executive. He is the CEO of Oura Health Oy, maker of the Oura smart ring. He is the former president of Momentive (NASDAQ:MNTV) and Chief Operating Officer of HomeAway.

Hale is an independent director for Cars.com (NYSE:CARS), RocketReach and Noiseaware. Past board roles include  Intralinks and  ReachLocal. He was Chief Product Officer of Linden Lab, the company that operates Second Life, from 2008 to 2010.

He was previously the General Manager of the Knowledge Worker Business Unit at Adobe Systems with responsibility for the Acrobat and web conferencing businesses. He served in various management positions at Macromedia, now owned by Adobe. After leaving Adobe he joined Redpoint Ventures as an Entrepreneur-In-Residence.

Hale earned his BA from Harvard University.

See also
 Oura Health
 Momentive
 SurveyMonkey
 HomeAway
 Adobe Systems
 Second Life
 Macromedia

References

External links
Macromedia Executive Bio

Second Life
1968 births
Living people
Harvard University alumni
American chief operating officers
American chief executives